The St. Paul Vulcans are a defunct Junior A ice hockey franchise that was based in Bloomington, Minnesota. The franchise was a charter member of the United States Hockey League (USHL) that started play with the 1979–80 season. The franchise was renamed the Twin Cities Vulcans for the start of the 1995 season. In 2000, the team was renamed the Tri-City Storm and moved to Kearney, Nebraska.

History
The Vulcans franchise began as the Minnesota Jr. Stars of the Thunder Bay-Minnesota Junior A Hockey League in 1971. A year later, the league changed its name to the Can-Am Junior Hockey League. The team also changed their name to the St. Paul Jr. Stars. Their rival, the Thunder Bay Vulcans, sponsored by an organization in St. Paul, dropped their sponsorship of the franchise when they announced they would be playing exclusively in Canada the next season. At the start of the 1973 playoffs, the Vulcan organization began funding the Jr. Stars and their name was changed to the St. Paul Vulcans. Despite the name change, the Vulcans were league champions in 1973 and for their only time in team history, entered into the Canadian Centennial Cup playdowns. In the Eastern Centennial Cup Quarter-final, the Vulcans squared off against the Central Junior A Hockey League's Pembroke Lumber Kings. The Lumber Kings downed the Vulcans 4-games-to-1 to end their playoff run.

Due to disagreements between the American and Canadian teams in the CAJHL, the league was divided into the Thunder Bay Junior A Hockey League (again) and the Midwest Junior Hockey League. The Vulcans would be one of the stronger members of the MWJHL. In 1977, the MWJHL would merge into the United States Hockey League - introducing junior hockey to what would become America's top tier of junior hockey.

In 1995, the St. Paul Vulcans were renamed the Twin Cities Vulcans in hopes of broadening the fan base to cover the entire Minneapolis–Saint Paul area. Jim Johannson was named head coach and general manager of the Vulcans in June 1995. Johannson stated that the team wanted to raise prices, but it would hurt the program which drew an average of 400 spectators per game, due to competition from other sporting events in the Twin Cities. In May 1998, Jim Hillman was promoted from assistant coach to replace Johannson who remained as the general manager.

In September 1999, the  USHL approved the sale of the franchise to be moved to Kearney, Nebraska to become the Tri-City Storm after the season. Johannson stated that the Vulcans were victims of declining attendance and a southward geographical shift of the USHL to Iowa and Nebraska. During the final five years of existence of the Vulcans, they played their home games in Mariucci Arena at the University of Minnesota, Wakota Arena in South St. Paul, Augsburg University Arena in Minneapolis, Columbia Arena in Fridley, and then at the Bloomington Ice Gardens in the final season.

The Vulcans placed sixth during the 1999–2000 season. In the playoffs, they defeated the Sioux Falls Stampede by three consecutive one-goal victories in the first round, then defeated the Lincoln Stars by three games to two in the second round, then lost to Green Bay Gamblers by four games to one in the Clark Cup finals. The Vulcans qualified for the USA Hockey Junior A National Championship since Green Bay was the host team. The Vulcans defeated the Danville Wings by a 3–0 score in the semifinals, then defeated the Green Bay Gamblers by a 4–1 score in the finals to win the national championship.

Season-by-season results

Playoffs
1972 Lost Final
Minnesota Jr. Stars defeated Westfort Hurricanes 2-games-to-none 
Thunder Bay Vulcans defeated Minnesota Jr. Stars 4-games-to-none 
1973 Won League, Won TBAHA Jack Adams Trophy final, Lost Dudley Hewitt Cup quarter-final
St. Paul Jr. Stars defeated Minneapolis Bruins by default (Bruins forfeit late in Game 1)
St. Paul Jr. Stars defeated Thunder Bay Centennials 4-games-to-none CAJHL CHAMPIONS, JACK ADAMS TROPHY CHAMPIONS
Pembroke Lumber Kings (CJHL) defeated St. Paul Vulcans 4-games-to-1

References

External links
Information on Vulcans
Team profile at The Internet hockey Database

Defunct ice hockey teams in Minnesota
Ice hockey teams in Minnesota